The Eastern Sierra Unified School District is a public school district in Mono County, California. The District is responsible for educating students within one of the largest geographical attendance areas of the 1,028 public schools in the state of California. The District has many school sites located throughout rural Mono County. It oversees public education in the central and northern part of the county, including the communities of:
Benton
Bridgeport
Coleville
June Lake
Lee Vining

Governance 
The ESUSD Governance Team meets every third Wednesday of each month unless otherwise scheduled. Meeting Agenda can be found at each school site, the District Office, Community Post Offices and online.

Eastern Sierra Unified is governed by a five-member board of trustees.  
Bob Tems 2014 - 2018 
John Peters 2012 - 2016 
Jimmy Little 2012 - 2016 
Gabriel Segura 2014 - 2018 
Ann Aylesworth 2014 - 2018

Staff 
The longstanding Superintendent is Dr. Don Clark. Clark was awarded the 2016 California Superintendent/Principal of the year by the Association of California School Administrators (ACSA). In 2015, Clark was also awarded ACSA Region XI Superintendent/Principal of the Year. ESUSD and Don Clark have mentored other Superintendents. Clark is currently the Inyo/Mono ACSA Charter President. Clark presented on governance team effectiveness and contracts to other Superintendents at the 2016 Superintendents' Symposium. He is the Chairperson for the State ACSA Small Schools Committee. Clark has provided overdue stability and multiple measures of increased student achievement for almost a decade.

The District Office is located in Bridgeport, CA.

The District Office Staff Includes: 
Don Clark, Ed.D. - Superintendent
Mollie Nugent- Business Manager
Ashley Custer - Executive Secretary
Kat Love - Accounting Technician
Tony Ruiz - Director of Facilities and Maintenance
Janina Santoyo - Counselor

Leadership 
ESUSD has been the blueprint for other rural school districts in strategic planning, governance team development and overall student achievement. It contains California Distinguished Schools and has produced medical doctors, lawyers, heavy equipment operators and numerous other successful career and college ready students. Clark, administrators, teachers, staff, parents and board members enabled students to realize their potential at increasing rates.

References

External links
 

School districts in Mono County, California